State Route 147 (SR 147) is a  state highway that runs west-to-east through portions of Toombs and Tattnall counties in the east-central part of the U.S. state of Georgia.

Route description

SR 147 begins at an intersection with U.S. Route 1 (US 1)/SR 4/SR 15 north of its crossing of the Altamaha River in southern Toombs County. The road heads to the northeast to an intersection with SR 178. It then heads northeast to its eastern terminus an intersection with US 280/SR 30 in Reidsville.

SR 147 is not part of the National Highway System.

Major intersections

See also

References

External links

 Georgia Roads (Routes 141 - 160)

147
Transportation in Toombs County, Georgia
Transportation in Tattnall County, Georgia